ProSport was a daily Romanian newspaper, the country's second largest and most read sports-related publication after Gazeta Sporturilor. It was owned by the PubliMedia International. It was launched in July 1997 by the Media Pro, the biggest media trust in Eastern Europe.

In 2000, the newspaper had average sales of around 79.910 copies, dropping to 43.000 copies in 2009, and losing the lead in sports newspapers.

Although a wide range of sports was covered in the newspaper, football was given by far most of the coverage. The newspaper was divided into a variety of different sections such as: national football, international football, sports and special. It usually included 24 pages which use a 6-column format, but also printed editions of 32 pages devoted to some specific events.

In 2019 Gândul Media Network company took over the ProSport brand.

References

External links
  

1997 establishments in Romania
2013 disestablishments in Romania
Defunct newspapers published in Romania
Sports mass media in Romania
Newspapers published in Bucharest
Newspapers established in 1997
Publications disestablished in 2013
Romanian-language newspapers
Sports newspapers